Anne-Marijke Podt (born 16 January 1975) is a Dutch politician of the social liberal party Democrats 66 (D66), who has been serving as a member of the House of Representatives since September 2021. She had previously been a member of the Utrecht municipal council starting in 2014, and she has worked as an aid worker and as an independent adviser for municipalities.

Early life and career 
Podt was born and raised in the South Holland town of Papendrecht and lived in its Molenwijk neighborhood. Her father was the manager of a factory of plastic products that her grandfather had founded. Podt attended the secondary school De Lage Waard and graduated in 1994 with an atheneum diploma. She subsequently studied industrial design engineering at Delft University of Technology for eight years, including one year as a full-time board member of a student association, and did an internship in Nicaragua. During the last three years of her study, Podt worked as a partner and trainer for a company called PinguinXL.

After graduating, she became a project manager at the traffic innovation department of CBR, which is responsible for driving licenses in the Netherlands. She then took a job in 2005 at the non-profit International Institute for Communication and Development (IICD) as a monitoring and evaluation expert and filled that position for five years. For the last three of those years, she also served as an ICT and democratization coordinator for the organization's Ecuador operations. Podt became the IICD's Kenya country manager in 2011. She left the foundation in 2014 to work as a freelance social adviser for municipalities under the name A Single Step.

While a freelancer, she held positions as an advisory board member of Utrecht University's Incluusion refugee program (2016) and as chair of the supervisory board of ActionAid Netherlands (2018–21).

Politics 
Podt ran for the Utrecht municipal council in 2014 and was elected as D66's seventh candidate. She had previously chaired D66's International Affairs/International Cooperation thematic department in the years 2010–12. In the council, Podt's specialties were youth, welfare, public health, diversity, social shelters, and addiction treatment. In 2016, she proposed a pilot to immediately give a house to 200 news refugees who have yet to receive a residence permit and to start their integration process. The plan did not receive enough support from the council. She also successfully pled for unisex toilets in municipal buildings in 2016 to make them more attractive for transgender people, making Utrecht the first municipality in the Netherlands to have them in its city hall. Podt was re-elected in 2018, being placed second on D66's party list, and became her party's vice caucus chair. Her specialties changed to work, income, LGBTI, refugees, integration, social shelters, and addiction treatment.

Podt participated in the March 2021 general election as D66's 26th candidate. She received 3,919 preference votes and was not elected, as her party won 24 seats. Following the resignation of D66 member of parliament Steven van Weyenberg, Podt was sworn into the House of Representatives on 7 September 2021. Van Weyenberg had stepped down due to his new cabinet position. Podt left the Utrecht municipal council and serves in the House as D66's spokesperson for refugees, migration, the Participation Act, migrant workers, labor conditions, integration, sex work, and human trafficking. She is on the Committees for Agriculture, Nature and Food Quality (vice chair); for Education, Culture and Science; for Finance; for Justice and Security; and for Social Affairs and Employment. In the House, Podt advocated allowing migrant workers into the Netherlands to mitigate personnel shortages.

Electoral history

Personal life 
Podt has been living in the city of Utrecht since the second half of the 2000s. She has a boyfriend and a daughter.

References

External links 
 Personal website 

1975 births
21st-century Dutch politicians
21st-century Dutch women politicians
Delft University of Technology alumni
Democrats 66 politicians
Living people
Members of the House of Representatives (Netherlands)
Municipal councillors of Utrecht (city)
People from Papendrecht